The 2003 Samoa National League, or also known as the Upolo First Division, was the 15th edition of the Samoa National League, the top league of the Football Federation Samoa. Strickland Brothers Lepea won their second consecutive title.

Regular season

Standings 
Known results from source:

Champion of Champions 
The 'Champion of Champions' is the knockout competition held after the regular season to decide the league champion.

Quarterfinals

Semifinals

Final

References

Samoa
Samoa National League seasons
2003 in Samoan sport